Ilan de Basso (born 1 October 1969) is a Turkish-born ethnic Assyrian Swedish politician from the Social Democratic Party.

Political career 
In 2021, he replaced Johan Danielsson in the European Parliament when he was appointed to the Andersson Cabinet.

He was elected a Member of the Riksdag in the 2022 Swedish general election.

See also 

 List of members of the Riksdag, 2022–2026

References 

Living people

1969 births
Turkish emigrants to Sweden
Swedish people of Turkish descent
MEPs for Sweden 2019–2024
Swedish Social Democratic Party MEPs
Linköping University alumni

Members of the Riksdag 2022–2026